Tomislav Crnković (1929–2009) was a Croatian footballer.

Tomislav Crnković may also refer to:
Tomislav Crnković (biathlete) (born 1991), Croatian biathlete
Tomislav Crnković (canoeist) (born 1956), Croatian canoeist

See also
Crnković (disambiguation)